Robert W. Groom served as a member of the California State Assembly, representing California's 1st State Assembly district, from 1859–1859 and 1860–1861.

References

Members of the California State Assembly
Year of birth missing
Year of death missing